John Brannon may refer to:

 John Brannon (American football) (born 1998), American football cornerback
 John Brannon (musician) (born 1961), American singer

See also 
 Brannon
 John Brannen (basketball) (born 1974), American basketball coach
 John Brannen (singer) (born 1952), American singer-songwriter